Makarovskaya is a rural locality (a village) and the administrative center of Moshinskoye Rural Settlement of Nyandomsky District, Arkhangelsk Oblast, Russia. The population was 71 as of 2010. There are 3 streets.

Geography 
Makarovskaya is located 44 km northeast of Nyandoma (the district's administrative centre) by road. Petarikha is the nearest rural locality.

References 

Rural localities in Nyandomsky District